Nemo is an unincorporated community in Hickory County, in the U.S. state of Missouri.

History
A post office called Nemo was established in 1893, and remained in operation until 1913. It is uncertain why the name "Nemo" was applied to this community.

References

Unincorporated communities in Hickory County, Missouri
Unincorporated communities in Missouri